The National Taipei University of Nursing and Health Sciences is a public Medical School located in Beitou District, Taipei, Taiwan.

History
Founded in 1954 as Taiwan Provincial Junior College of Nursing, National Taipei University of Nursing and Health Sciences (NTUNHS) has undergone various transformations in its history. In 1963, the college consolidated with Taipei Senior Vocational School of Medicine, and was renamed Taiwan Provincial Vocational School of Nursing and Midwifery, a five-year junior college. Reformed again from a state-run institution in 1994, the school changed its name to National Taipei College of Nursing. This title continued until August 2010, when the School was formally renamed National Taipei University of Nursing and Health Sciences. Since 1994, NTUNHS has established the Department of Medical & Nursing Management and the Department of Infant & Child Care. In 1999, NTUNHS started its master's program in Nursing and Health Care Management, Long-Term care, Nursing-Midwifery, Health Allied Education, and Speech & Hearing Disorders and Sciences. In 2002, NTUNHS further established the Department of Exercise & Health Science and Department of Information Management. Upon approval by the Ministry of Education in 2005, NTUNHS established a doctoral program in nursing; this was the first doctoral nursing program in the nation provided by a technological and vocational school. In 2007, the Department of Nursing began recruiting international students to its master's program, inaugurating its English-based international nursing program at the school. In August 2010, NTUNHS was formally renamed the National Taipei University of Nursing and Health Sciences, comprising the College of Nursing, College of Healthcare Administration and Management, College of Human Development and Health, and Center of General Education. At present, NTUNHS is made up of three colleges, including five departments, twelve graduate programs, and one center.

Campus
Main Campus
Address: No. 365, Ming-te Road, Beitou District, Taipei, Taiwan

Downtown Campus
Address: No. 89, Neijiang Street, Wanhua District, Taipei, Taiwan

School
 College of Nursing
 College of Health Technology
 College of Human Development and Health

Bachelor's Degree

Under the College of Nursing
 Nursing
 Gerontologist Health Care
 Nurse-Midwifery and Women Health
 Allied Health Education and Digital Learning

Under the College of Health Technology
 Speech Pathology and Audiology 
 Health Care Management 
 Information Management 
 Long-Term Care 
 Healthcare Management 
 Leisure Industry and Health Promotion

Under the College of Human Development and Health
 Thanatology and Health Counseling
 Infant and Child Care
 Exercise and Health Science

Partmer University

Africa 
 ：Ecole Nacionale De Sante Publique of Burkina Faso

North America 
 : University of Southern California
 : San Diego State University
 : University of Maryland, College Park
 : University of the Incarnate Word
 : University of Washington
 : Southern California University of Health Sciences
 : University of Miami
 : University of Michigan–Flint
 : Oklahoma City University
 : Eastern Michigan University

Asia 
 : National University of Singapore
 : Seoul Women's College of Nursing
 : Beijing University of Chinese Medicine
 : Universiti Tunku Abdul Rahman
 : The Global Leadership University 
 : Govi-Altai school of Health Sciences University of Mongolia
 : Otoch Manramba University
 : College of Asian Scholars
 : Chiang Mai University
 : Hue University of Medicine and Pharmacy
 : Tra Vinh University
 : Aisyiyah Health Sciences College of Indonesia
 : Muhammadiyah University of Surakarta
 : Muhammadiyah Midwifery Academy of Cirebon
 : University of Muhammadiyah Purwokerto
 : University Muhammadiyah of Jakarta
 : Universitas Muhammadiyah Semarang
 : Muhammadiyah University of West Sumatra
 : Muhammadiyah Health Sciences Institute of Gombong
 : University of Muhammadiyah of Tangerang
 : Aisyiyah Midwifery Academy of Banten
 : Aisyiyah Health Sciences College of Surakarta
 : Aisyiyah Midwifery Academy of Pontianak
 : Prima Nusantara Health College, Bukit Tinggi
 : Dehasen Health Sciences College, Bengkulu, Sumatera
 : Health Sciences College of Indonesia, Padang, Sumatera
 : Royal College of Surgeons in Ireland–Medical University of Bahrain

Europe 
 : Ulster University
 : Queen's University Belfast
 : University of Bedfordshire
 : University of Ostrava

Oceania 
 : University of Canberra
 : Queensland University of Technology
 : Griffith University
 : Deakin University
 : Manukau Institute of Technology
 : University of Auckland

See also
 List of universities in Taiwan

References

External links

 

1954 establishments in Taiwan
Educational institutions established in 1954
Universities and colleges in Taipei
Nursing schools in Taiwan
Scientific organizations based in Taiwan
Universities and colleges in Taiwan
Technical universities and colleges in Taiwan